The United Nations General Assembly declared the year 2011 as International Year for People of African Descent (in UN resolution A/RES/64/169). That year also marked the 10th anniversary of the World Conference Against Racism (also known as the Durban Conference), which approved a resolution stating that slavery along with the colonization that sustained it were crimes against humanity.

Selected related initiatives
The United Nations High Commission for Human Rights coordinated activities surrounding the Year, and encouraged other parties, both UN agencies as well as member states, to carry out similar initiatives. These included:

 February: Islands as Crossroads: Sustaining Cultural Diversity in Small Island Developing States (publication)
 February 4–24: Exhibition on Arts and Poetry by artist Hilda Zagaglia, Alta Garcia, Argentina
 February 28–March 3: Meeting of the International Scientific Committee of the UNESCO Slave Route Project, Bogota
 March 21–23: SEPHIS Workshop "Equity, Justice, Development: People of African Descent in Latin America in comparative Perspective", University of Cartagena, Colombia
 April: Launching of the international Year for People of African Descent in Brazil, UNESCO Brasilia
 May 4–11: Black International Cinema Festival, Fountainhead Tanz Theatre, Berlin, Germany
 May 10: Commemorating the Slave Trade and Slavery as a Crime against Humanity, France
 June 6–12: Afro-Brazilian Arts and Cultural Heritage Festival, Washington DC, United States of America
 July 4–15: Harriet Tubman Student Summer Programme on "Introduction to African and African Diaspora Studies", York University, Toronto, Canada
 August 11–13: Pan-African Women's Action Summit, Minneapolis Community and Technical College, Minneapolis, Minnesota, US
 August 23: International Day for the Remembrance of the Slave Trade and its Abolition
 Angola: Conference "Escravos angolanos povoaram tambem as Antilhas Neerlandesas" ("Angolan slaves also populated the Netherlands Antilles"), organized by the Eduardo dos Santos Foundation, at the Agostinho Neto University in Luanda
 Democratic Republic of Congo (DRC): Workshop on achievements of the Slave Route Project in the DRC, with presentation of The Slave Trade, Slavery and Colonial Violence in the Democratic Republic of Congo (published 2010)
 Ghana: Workshop on the slave trade for educators from three regions of the world, Accra
 Grenada: exhibition and commemorative activities organized by National Commission for UNESCO and the National Museum of Grenada, St. George's
 Madagascar: screening of the documentary Slave Routes: A Global Vision, at the University of Antananarivo
 Saint Kitts and Nevis: launch of the activities of the national committee for the Slave Route Project
 Senegal: Panel discussion, painting and photo exhibition, cultural and artistic activities at the Joseph Ndiaye Socio-cultural Centre, Gorée
 UK: Commemoration at the National Maritime Museum, London
 September 22–24: 7th International African Diaspora Heritage Trail Conference, World Trade and Convention Centre, Halifax, Nova Scotia, Canada
 October: Boscoe Holder exhibition at the Upper Room Art Gallery at Top of the Mount, Mount Saint Benedict, St Augustine, Trinidad
 October 20: Panel discussion "The Causes and Consequences of Racism", Eastern Michigan University, Ypsilanti, Michigan, US
 October 29: Celebration of the International Year for People of African Descent and Promotion of the General History of Africa, UNESCO, Paris
 November 2 (–June 24, 2012): Itinerant photographic exhibition: "Women in Africa - No Color One Color", Italian Institute of Culture, Nairobi, Kenya; Sheraton Hotel, Milan Malpensa Airport, Italy; and other venues
 November 9: Celebration – International Year for People of African Descent; Africa, Mère de tous les peuples. Palais des Nations, Geneva, Switzerland
 Brazil-Africa: Crossed Histories Programme in the 36th UNESCO General Conference

See also
International Decade for People of African Descent (2015–2024)

References

External links
 Official website

African Descent
2011 in international relations